Henryton is an unincorporated community in Carroll County, Maryland, United States. It is located along the Patapsco River.

Transportation
The Owings Mills station of the Baltimore Metro SubwayLink in nearby Owings Mills, Baltimore County, is a 20-minute drive by car from Carrolltowne and provides subway access to downtown Baltimore.

There is no bus link between Henryton/Eldersburg and nearby Randallstown in Baltimore County, in part due to longstanding opposition to inter-county public transit from Carroll County officials and residents.

References

Unincorporated communities in Carroll County, Maryland
Unincorporated communities in Maryland